The Mandaue City Comprehensive National High School (MCCNHS) is a public secondary comprehensive school of the City of Mandaue, Cebu. It has two campuses, the main (located in Brgy. Centro) and the annex (situated in Brgy Looc). The annex campus is located behind the Norkis Park and access to the other side can be had by way of a covered pedestrian overpass which spanned DM Cortes St. The main campus is situated between the Mandaue City Engineer's Office Building (south) and the Department of Education Mandaue City Division Building (north).

References

External links
 Official Facebook Page...

High schools in Cebu
Schools in Mandaue
Educational institutions established in 1986
Public schools in the Philippines
1986 establishments in the Philippines